Keshiary Assembly constituency is an assembly constituency in Paschim Medinipur district in the Indian state of West Bengal. It is reserved for scheduled tribes.

Overview
As per orders of the Delimitation Commission, No. 223 Keshiary Assembly constituency (ST) is composed of the following: Keshiari community development block, and Alikosha, Angua, Anikola, Dantan I, Dantan II, Monoharpur, Salikotha and Tararui gram panchayats of Dantan I community development block.

Keshiary Assembly constituency is part of No. 34 Medinipur (Lok Sabha constituency).

Election results

2021

2016

2011

  

.# Swing calculated on Congress+Trinamool Congress vote percentages taken together in 2006.

1977-2006
Maheswar Murmu of CPI(M) won the Keshiary assembly seat (ST) six times in a row from 1982 to 2006, defeating Shyam Charan Mandi of Trinamool Congress in 2006 and 2001. Contests in most years were multi cornered but only winners and runners are being mentioned. Gouri Tudu of Congress in 1996, Rekha Kishu of Congress in 1991, Budhan Chandra Tudu of Congress in 1987 and 1982. Khudiram Singh of CPI(M) defeated Budhan Chandra Tudu of Congress in 1977.

1967-1972
Budhan Chandra Tudu of Congress won in 1972, 1971, 1969 and 1967. Prior to that the Keshiary seat did not exist.

References

Assembly constituencies of West Bengal
Politics of Paschim Medinipur district